The UK Albums Chart is one of many music charts compiled by the Official Charts Company that calculates the best-selling albums of the week in the United Kingdom. Since 2004 the chart has been based on the sales of both physical albums and digital downloads. Since 2015, the album chart has been based on both sales and streaming. This list shows albums that peaked in the top ten of the UK Albums Chart during 2019, as well as albums which peaked in 2018 and 2020 but were in the top 10 in 2019. The entry date is when the album appeared in the top 10 for the first time (week ending, as published by the Official Charts Company, which is six days after the chart is announced).

One-hundred and seventy-three albums were in the top ten this year. Two albums from 2017 and fifteen albums from 2018 remained in the top ten for several weeks at the beginning of the year, while Heavy Is the Head by Stormzy was released in 2019 but did not reach its peak until 2020. Fine Line by Harry Styles debuted this year but its peak position was not until two years later in 2021. Christmas by Michael Bublé was originally released in 2011, launched a new chart run in 2018, reaching a peak on its latest run in 2019 and again in 2020. 50 Years – Don't Stop by Fleetwood Mac and Unchained Melodies by Roy Orbison & The Royal Philharmonic Orchestra  were the albums from 2018 to reach their peak in 2019. Four artists have scored multiple entries in the top 10 in 2019, as of 12 September 2019 (week ending). AJ Tracey, Freya Ridings, Khalid, Lewis Capaldi, Sigrid and Tom Walker were among the many artists who achieved their first UK charting top ten album in 2019.

The Greatest Showman Cast's The Greatest Showman: Original Motion Picture Soundtrack remained at the top of the chart for the opening four weeks of the year, totalling twenty-eight weeks at number-one since it was released in January 2018. The first new number-one album of the year was Amo by Bring Me the Horizon. Overall, thirty-one different albums peaked at number-one in 2019, with thirty-one unique artists hitting that position.

Background

Multiple entries
One-hundred and seventeen albums have charted in the top ten in 2019 (as of 12 September 2019, week ending), with one-hundred and three albums reaching their peak this year (including the re-entries Diamonds and Direct Hits, which charted in previous years but reached a peak on their latest chart run).

Four artists have scored multiple entries in the top ten in 2019 (as of 12 September 2019, week ending).

Chart debuts
The following table (collapsed on desktop site) does not include acts who had previously charted as part of a group and secured their first top-ten solo album, or featured appearances on compilations or other artists recordings. 
 

Notes

Claire Richards of the group Steps reached the top 10 with her debut solo album this year, Wildest Dreams. This added to her haul of six top 10 albums with Steps to date, including three which had topped the chart. Serge Pizzorno, the lead singer of Kasabian launched his solo project The S.L.P. and released an album of the same name which reached the top 10. All but one of Kasabian's six albums to date made number-one, the only one to miss out being their self-titled debut effort in 2004 which peaked at number four.

Soundtracks
Soundtrack albums for various films entered the top 10 throughout the year. This included Rocketman: Music from the Motion Picture. Bohemian Rhapsody and The Greatest Showman both remained in the top 10 for much of 2019, after first charting in 2018.

Best-selling albums
Lewis Capaldi had the best-selling album of the year with Divinely Uninspired to a Hellish Extent. The album spent 36 weeks in the top 10 (31 this year, including eight weeks at number one), recorded over 600,000 combined sales and was certified 2× platinum by the BPI. No. 6 Collaborations Project by Ed Sheeran came in second place. The Greatest Showman Cast's The Greatest Showman: Original Motion Picture Soundtrack , When We All Fall Asleep, Where Do We Go? by Billie Eilish and Staying at Tamara's by George Ezra made up the top five. Albums by Queen, Ariana Grande, Tom Walker, Lady Gaga & Bradley Cooper and Rod Stewart with the Royal Philharmonic Orchestra were also in the top ten best-selling albums of the year.

Top-ten albums
Key

Entries by artist

The following table shows artists who have achieved two or more top 10 entries in 2019, including albums that reached their peak in 2018. The figures only include main artists, with featured artists and appearances on compilation albums not counted individually for each artist. The total number of weeks an artist spent in the top ten in 2019 is also shown.

Notes

 Divide re-entered the top 10 at number 10 on 24 January 2019 (week ending). It re-entered the top 10 again at number 8 on 23 May 2019 (week ending).
 Dua Lipa re-entered the top 10 at number 9 on 24 January 2019 (week ending).
Mamma Mia! Here We Go Again: The Movie Soundtrack re-entered the top 10 at number 9 on 10 January 2019 (week ending) for 3 weeks.
 Always In Between re-entered the top 10 at number 7 on 10 January 2019 (week ending) for 5 weeks, at number 10 on 21 February 2019 (week ending) and at number 7 on 7 March 2019 (week ending).
 Bohemian Rhapsody re-entered the top 10 at number 9 on 3 January 2019 (week ending) for 5 weeks (as of 21 February 2019 week ending).
 The Platinum Collection originally peaked outside the top 10 at number 63 upon its initial release in 2000. It charted in the top 10 for the first time in 2002, peaking at number 2. It re-entered the top 10 at number 10 on 17 January 2019 (week ending) and the same position on 31 January 2019 (week ending). It re-entered again at number 9 on 21 February 2019 (week ending) for 3 weeks (as of 7 March 2019, week ending).
 A Brief Inquiry Into Online Relationships re-entered the top 10 at number 10 on 7 March 2019 (week ending).
 Carpenters with the Royal Philharmonic Orchestra re-entered the top 10 at number 10 on 4 April 2019 (week ending).
 Thank U, Next re-entered the top 10 at number 9 on 2 May 2019 (week ending) and at number 10 on 16 May 2019 (week ending) for 2 weeks.
 Hurts 2B Human re-entered the top 10 at number 9 on 4 July 2019 (week ending).
 Diamonds originally peaked at number 5 on its initial release in 2017.
 Direct Hits originally peaked at number 6 on its initial release in 2013.
 Figure includes album that peaked in 2017.
 Figure includes album that peaked in 2018.

See also
2019 in British music
List of UK Albums Chart number ones of the 2010s

References
General

Specific

External links
2019 album chart archive at the Official Charts Company (click on relevant week)

United Kingdom top 10 albums
Top 10 albums
2019